Christine Grant may refer to:

Christine Grant (administrator), American academic administrator
Christine Grant (alpine skier) (born 1962), New Zealand alpine skier
Christine Grant (scientist), American chemical engineer